By the Gods is a role-playing game published by Ragnarok Enterprises in 1986.

Description
By the Gods: Adventure in the Realm of Myths  is a mythological fantasy system, similar to the Ysgarth rules, with a 16-page rulebook and a 40-page "Pantheon" book. The game includes three scenarios.

Publication history
By the Gods was designed by David F. Nalle and published by Ragnarok Enterprises in 1986 as two digest-sized books (40 pages and 16 pages).

Reception

References

Fantasy role-playing games
Role-playing games introduced in 1986